How Like a Winter is a gothic doom metal  band from Italy that was formed in the mid-1990s, although their first recording was not until much later. The band's music, which can be described as atmospheric and melancholy, is composed using violins, various classical, acoustic and electric guitars, and features male and female vocalists; the band members all use evocative pseudonyms. Male vocals are both clean and growled, whereas the female duo of Tragedy and Misery are invariably clean. Delicate violins mingle with heavy guitar riffs and are complemented by acoustic guitar solos. The band's music has been likened to that of Paradise Lost, Celestial Season, Novembers Doom, Shape of Despair, and My Dying Bride. Guitarist Mist lists My Dying Bride as a great inspiration, along with Opeth and Katatonia among others.

Their first recording was the 2001 demo-CD The Winter's Near. The band subsequently released their full-length album ...Beyond My Grey Wake in 2003. Both CDs were recorded at Temple of Noise studios, Rome, Italy. The release of their debut full-length album was met by very favourable reviews from magazines including Vampire Magazine, Digital Metal and Metal Edge. Martyr Music Group stated "Early in the year (2003) How Like a Winter's debut CD ...Beyond My Grey Wake comes out and the response was simply phenomenal".
The band are currently working on new material.

Etymology
The band's name is taken from the first line of William Shakespeare's sonnet XCVII:- "How like a winter hath my absence been".

Members
 Dust − male vocals, piano, orchestra
 Agony − violins  	
 Tragedy − female vocals
 Misery − female vocals
 Bane − bass guitar
 Mist − classical, acoustic, electric guitars

Discography
 The Winter's Near (Demo, 2001)
 ...Beyond My Grey Wake (CD, 2003)

References

External links
 Official website

Italian doom metal musical groups
Italian gothic metal musical groups
Musical groups established in 1995